Depë Zenebishi, also Depas or Thopia Zenevisi (1379–1435), was an Albanian nobleman. The son of John Zenevisi, he had settled in his father's estate in Corfu after the conquest of Gjirokastër by the Ottoman Empire in 1418. He was called to lead the rebels in the area of Gjirokastër during the Albanian Revolt of 1432-1436 and was defeated by Turahan Bey in early 1433. He was captured and later executed.

Life

The son of John Zenevisi he had settled in his father's estate in Corfu after the conquest of Gjirokastër by the Ottoman Empire in 1418. He was called to lead the rebels in the area of Gjirokastër during the Albanian Revolt of 1432-1436 and was defeated by Turahan Bey in early 1433. He was captured and later executed.

Ancestry

See also
Albanian Principalities

Annotations

References

Depe
1379 births
1435 deaths
15th-century Albanian people
14th-century Albanian people
15th-century executions by the Ottoman Empire
Executed Albanian people